Cédric Anselin (born 24 July 1977) is a French former professional footballer who played as a midfielder. He was a French under-21 international. He subsequently managed Norwich United from 2018 to 2020.

Career
Anselin was born in Lens, Pas-de-Calais. He began his career in his native France with Bordeaux and Lille. While with Bordeaux, he played in the 1996 UEFA Cup Final alongside, among others, Zinedine Zidane and Bixente Lizarazu.

Anselin joined English club Norwich City on loan towards the end of the 1998-99 season and signed permanently for a fee of £250,000 in the summer of 1999. He found it difficult to settle at Carrow Road due in part to the language barrier, and the club agreed to release him in the summer of 2001. He scored one goal during his spell at Norwich, his strike coming in a 4–2 win over Oxford United.

He spent the majority of the 2001–02 season with the Scottish club Ross County before his career took him to the Bolivian team Oriente Petrolero. He returned to England, briefly playing with Cambridge United before moving into non-league football. A brief spell at King's Lynn was followed by a move further down the league pyramid to Dereham Town late in 2007. He then signed a contract with Lowestoft Town. On 25 August 2009, he joined the coaching team of Norwich United. He also made a brief 45-minute appearance against a Norwich City XI in a July 2010 preseason friendly. He left the club in June 2020.

References

Canary Citizens by Mark Davage, John Eastwood, Kevin Platt, published by Jarrold Publishing, (2001),

External links
Career information at ex-canaries.co.uk
Interview with Anselin talking about his battle with Mental Health

Article about Cédric Anselin from When Saturday Comes
Article about Cédric Anselin from the Pink'un
 https://www.pitchero.com/clubs/norwichunitedfc/news/cedric-talks-to-my-football-writer-2416265.html

1977 births
Living people
People from Lens, Pas-de-Calais
Association football midfielders
French footballers
FC Girondins de Bordeaux players
Lille OSC players
Norwich City F.C. players
Ross County F.C. players
Oriente Petrolero players
Mildenhall Town F.C. players
Cambridge United F.C. players
Ebbsfleet United F.C. players
King's Lynn F.C. players
Dereham Town F.C. players
Lowestoft Town F.C. players
Ligue 1 players
English Football League players
Scottish Football League players
French expatriate footballers
Expatriate footballers in England
Expatriate footballers in Scotland
Expatriate footballers in Bolivia
France under-21 international footballers
Norwich United F.C. managers
Sportspeople from Pas-de-Calais
French football managers
Footballers from Hauts-de-France
French expatriate sportspeople in England
French expatriate sportspeople in Scotland
French expatriate sportspeople in Bolivia